The Oxfordshire Senior Football League is an association football competition based in Oxfordshire, England. The league has three divisions; the Premier Division comprising clubs' first teams, whilst the other two divisions are reserve and development sides. The Premier Division is at step 7 of the National League System or level 11 of the overall English football league system. The top club is eligible for promotion to the Hellenic League Division One.

For the 2022-23 season there are 14 clubs competing in the Premier Division, 12 in Division One and 12 in Division Two.

2022–23 members

Premier Division
 Adderbury Park
 Ashton Folly
 Bicester Hallions
 Bure Park
 Carterton 
 Charlton United
 Cropredy
 Garsington 
 Halse United 
 Kennington Athletic
 Launton Sports
 Marston Saints 
 Saxton Rovers 
 Yarnton

Division One
 Abingdon Abbotts
 Adderbury Park Development 
 Bicester Town Colts 
 Chalgrove Cavaliers
 Cropredy Development
 Easington Sports Clan 
 Kidlington "A"
 North Leigh United Development
 Oxford Irish Athletic
 Sporting Headington Academicals
 Summertown Stars AFC
 Woodstock Town Development

Division Two
 Abingdon Abbotts Development
 Bicester Town Colts Development
 Charlton United Reserves
 Chinnor Reserves
 Garsington Reserves
 Halse United Reserves
 Kennington Athletic Reserves
 Launton Sports Development 
 Marston Saints Reserves
 Saxton Rovers Reserves 
 Summertown Stars AFC Reserves
 Yarnton Reserves

Recent champions

External links
 Mitoo to season 2012–13
 Full-Time season 2013–14 onwards

 
Football in Oxfordshire
Football leagues in England